Vicente LLP, formally known as Vicente Sederberg, is an American cannabis law firm headquartered in Denver, Colorado that represents clients in the cannabis industry (marijuana, hemp, CBD) and works on state and local cannabis policy reform. As of 2019, the firm was nationally recognized by Chambers and Partners as one of seven Band 1 Law firms in the US practicing cannabis law.

History 
Founded in 2010 by Brian Vicente, Christian Sederberg, and Josh Kappel - from its offset, Vicente only practices in areas directly related to cannabis and psychedelics. The firm’s former Denver office, the Creswell Mansion, was built in 1889 by Denver architect John J. Huddart and added to the National Register of Historic Places in 1977. After six years at "The Mansion", VS's Denver location moved to their current office located at 455 Sherman St., Suite 390 Denver, CO 80203 in November of 2016. The current office was the previous home to the Marijuana Enforcement Division of Colorado.

Advocacy
Vicente played a key role in passing Colorado Amendment 64, a ballot initiative to legalize, regulate, and tax the sale of marijuana to adults 21 or older. Founding partner Brian Vicente was a co-author of Amendment 64 and the law firm's office served as the campaign headquarters. 

The firm also has played a significant role in advising national, state and local government officials in the development of regulated cannabis markets across the country and around the world, including Uruguay, the first country in the world to legalize and regulate marijuana for adult use.

Firm founding partner Christian Sederberg is a Colorado lobbyist who worked on former Colorado Governor John Hickenlooper's Amendment 64 Implementation Task force and the Committee for Responsible Regulation, and other committees and associations.

Vicente's Hemp and Cannabinoids Practice Chair, partner Shawn Hauser, is a steering committee member of the American Hemp Campaign, and was the lead author of the 2018 Farm Bill Policy Guide and Model Hemp Production Plan].

In The Media 
In April 2014, 5280 magazine listed Vicente and Sederberg as among the most powerful people in Denver.

References

External links

Law firms based in Denver
Cannabis law in the United States
Law firms established in 2010